Lyman Eddy Barnes (June 30, 1855January 16, 1904) was an American lawyer and politician.  He was a member of the United States House of Representatives from Wisconsin.

Biography
Barnes was born in Weyauwega, Wisconsin, the son of William W. Barnes and Lucy Eddy Thomas Barnes. He attended the public schools in Oshkosh and the law department of Columbia College, New York City.
He was admitted to the bar in 1876 and commenced practice in Appleton, Wisconsin, the same year.
He moved to Rockledge, Florida, in 1882, where he remained about five years and continued the practice of law.
He returned to Appleton, Wisconsin, and, for a time, partnered with John Goodland, the father of future Governor Walter Samuel Goodland.  He was elected district attorney of Outagamie County in 1890.

Barnes was elected as a member of the Democratic Party to the 53rd United States Congress (March 4, 1893 – March 3, 1895). While in Congress, he represented Wisconsin's 8th congressional district.
He was an unsuccessful candidate for reelection in 1894 to the 54th United States Congress.

Personal life

Barnes married Helen Byrd Conkey, the daughter of Theodore Conkey, in 1880.  They had at least five children.  Barnes died suddenly on January 16, 1904, in Appleton.  He was interred at Riverside Cemetery in Oshkosh.

References

External links 

 

1855 births
1904 deaths
People from Weyauwega, Wisconsin
Democratic Party members of the United States House of Representatives from Wisconsin
19th-century American politicians
District attorneys in Wisconsin
Politicians from Appleton, Wisconsin
People from Rockledge, Florida
Florida lawyers
Columbia College (New York) alumni